The Pineapple Thief are a British progressive rock band, started by Bruce Soord in 1999 in Somerset, England.

History

Early years 
Founder Bruce Soord started The Pineapple Thief as an outlet for his music back in 1999. Soord released the debut Abducting the Unicorn on Cyclops Records, which created enough interest to establish a small but loyal fan base. Soord returned to the Dining Room studios to work on the second album 137.

During this time, several major labels started to take an interest, causing a delay in the release which arrived over two years after the debut. However, it was debatably the third album, Variations on a Dream that gave the band the boost it needed, reaching out to yet more people all over the world, by which point they were consistently the top sellers on their label, Cyclops.

After this release in the spring of 2002 Bruce decided to form a band to take his music to the fans. The band consisted of his close musical friends – former university bandmate Jon Sykes on bass, Wayne Higgins on guitars, Matt O'Leary on keyboards and Keith Harrison on drums. As a full band, they released 12 Stories Down in 2004, but Bruce Soord was unhappy with the final sound and re-recorded, remixed and changed some of the tracks before the release of 10 Stories Down in 2005. Matt O'Leary subsequently left the band, but Steve Kitch (who co-produced and mixed 10 Stories Down) joined to play keyboards.

Following the release of Little Man in 2006, the band released What We Have Sown in late 2007 as a final Cyclops release before being signed to Kscope, a division of Snapper Music. In 2007 The Pineapple Thief's music featured on the final Episode of the MTV show The Hills.  The song 'Snowdrops' can be heard on episode 28 during a scene between Lauren & Jo.

Wayne Higgins left the band in March 2008, but the group continued as a four-piece live act, playing gigs across Europe, Canada and the US throughout much of the following years.

The Kscope years 

In May 2008, The Pineapple Thief helped relaunch the Kscope label with the critically acclaimed album Tightly Unwound, which was marked by launch shows at Witchwood in Manchester on 17 May 2008 and at the Water Rats Theatre in London on 22 May 2008. The same day as the album's release, a mini-documentary filmed at The Half Moon, London, was released through the band's website, featuring interviews and two exclusive live tracks.

This was followed in 2009 by The Dawn Raids EPs and 3000 Days, a 2-CD re-mixed and re-mastered collection of songs from their ten-year history to date. In January 2010, their 2006 album, Little Man was also fully remixed by Bruce Soord and Steve Kitch and released through Kscope with new artwork. There are plans to gradually give all of their back catalogue the same treatment as the Cyclops albums are no longer available and sell for large sums in the second-hand market. 2009 also saw them supporting Riverside on the UK leg of their European tour.

Someone Here Is Missing was launched at a show at Bush Hall, London on 19 May 2010, whose attendees included Kscope labelmates Steven Wilson of Porcupine Tree and Daniel Cavanagh of Anathema. The album also features artwork by the legendary designer Storm Thorgerson.  The album continues to nurture the band's trademark ‘bittersweet’ progressive sound.

2010 saw a number of European festival appearances and a full 2-week tour of mainland Europe.  This was recorded and released as the download-only album Someone Here Is Live.

The band entered the studio in January 2012 to record their ninth album, which included (for the first time) a 22-piece orchestra and choir. All the Wars was released in September 2012 and followed by a UK tour.

On 8 February 2014 the band announced that Dan Osborne had replaced Keith Harrison on drums.

The Pineapple Thief's tenth studio album, Magnolia, was released on 15 September 2014. It peaked at number 55 on UK Album Chart.

In August 2016 the band released the album Your Wilderness, featuring Gavin Harrison on drums, through Kscope.

On the last day of August 2018, the band released their 12th studio album, Dissolution. Gavin Harrison returned on drums, this time taking a more active role in the songwriting. The band embarked on a European tour with Gavin Harrison on drums and George Marios on guitars, and LiZzard as the support act.

On 4 September 2020 their 13th studio album Versions of the Truth was released.

Members 
 Bruce Soord – vocals (1999–present); guitars, keyboards (2002–present); all instrumentation (1999–2002)
 Jon Sykes – bass guitar, vocals (2002–present)
 Steve Kitch – keyboards (2005–present)
 Gavin Harrison – drums (2017–present); session drums (2016-2017)

Session/live
 Beren Matthews – guitar, vocals (2021–present)

Former
 Wayne Higgins – guitars, vocals (2002–2008)
 Keith Harrison – drums, vocals (2002–2013)
 Matt O'Leary – keyboards (2002–2005)
 Dan Osborne – drums, vocals (2013–2016)

Former session/live
 Darran Charles – guitars, vocals (2014–2017)
 George Marios – guitar, vocals (2018–2021)

Timeline

Discography 
Studio albums
 Abducting the Unicorn (1999) – re-released in 2017 as Abducted at Birth, remastered with one bonus track
 One Three Seven (137) (2002)
 Variations on a Dream (2003)
 10 Stories Down (2005) – 12 Stories Down (2004), a preview edition of 10 Stories Down
 Little Man (2006)
 What We Have Sown (2007)
 Tightly Unwound (2008)
 Someone Here Is Missing (2010)
 All the Wars (2012)
 Magnolia (2014)
 Your Wilderness (2016)
 8 Years Later (2016)
 Dissolution (2018)
 Versions of the Truth (2020)
 Give It Back (2022)

Live albums and videos
 Live (2003) – DVD/CD + 4 new studio tracks
 Live at the Half Moon, Putney (2008) – video
 Someone Here Is Live (2010) – download only, recorded October 2010
 Live at the 013 (2013) – download only, recorded November 2012
 Live 2014 (2014) – download only, recorded November 2014
 Where We Stood (2017) – DVD/CD, recorded February 2017
 Hold Our Fire (2019) – CD, recorded September 2018
 Nothing But the Truth (2021) – DVD/CD, live in the studio recording

Compilation albums
 3000 Days (2009)
 Introducing the Pineapple Thief (2013)

EP albums
 4 Stories Down (2005)
 The Dawn Raids Volume 1 (2009)
 The Dawn Raids Volume 2 (2009)
 Show a Little Love (2010)
 Build a World (2013)
 Uncovering Your Tracks (2020) – re-recorded songs

Singles
 "Sherbert Gods" (2001) – 7" single
 "Shoot First'" (2008) – download only single
 "Nothing at Best" (2010) – download only single

Music videos
 "Shoot First" (2008)
 "Nothing at Best" (2010)
 "Show a Little Love" (2010)
 "Someone Here Is Missing" (2010)
 "All the Wars" (2012)
 "Someone Pull Me Out of Here" (2012)
 "Build a World" (2013)
 "Simple as That" (2014)
 "A Sense of Fear" (2014)
 "In Exile" (2016)
 "Try as I Might" (2018)
 "Demons" (2020)
 "Break It All" (2020)
 "Versions of the Truth" (2020)
 "Driving Like Maniacs" (2020)

References

External links 

 
 Kscope Mini Site
 The Pineapple Thief news on Kscope
 Official MySpace site

British indie rock groups